The Mount William stone axe quarry is an Aboriginal Australian archaeological site in Central Victoria, Australia. Known as Wil-im-ee moor-ring, meaning "axe place" in the Woiwurrung language, the greenstone quarry was an important source of raw material for the manufacture of greenstone ground-edge axes, which were traded over a wide area of south-east Australia.

Description

The Mount William Aboriginal stone axe quarry comprises the remains of hundreds of mining pits and the mounds of waste rock where Aboriginal people obtained greenstone (diabase), and manufactured stone blanks for axe heads. Chipped and ground stone axes or hatchets were an essential part of Aboriginal toolkits in southeast Australia, with the Mount William greenstone being one of the most prized and extensively traded materials. The stone was quarried from the source outcrops, and roughly flaked into blanks, then taken away for finer flaking and grinding the edge. There are 268 mining pits, 18 of which are several metres deep, surrounded by at least 34 discrete flaking floors, with mounds of debris up to 20 metres in diameter and some featuring a central outcropping rock used as an anvil.
  
Mount William lies within one of six Cambrian greenstone belts in Victoria where several other greenstone quarries have also been found including Mount Camel, Howqua River, Cosgrove, Jallukar, Berrambool and Baronga on the Hopkins River; and Ceres and Dog Rocks near Geelong. However, none of the axes at Mount William have been ground and polished into finished hatchet heads. The nearest axe grinding grooves can be found at Mount Macedon, about 29 kilometres away, where analysis of stone fragments showed they were the same diabase stone as the Mount William greenstone.

History

William Bradley appears to have been the first to describe the exchange of Mount William stone on 12 November 1838:

In 1854 William Blandowski, the first zoologist at the Melbourne Museum, visited Mount William and provided the first written description: The celebrated spot which supplies the natives with stone (phonolite) for their tomahawks, and of which I had been informed by the tribes 400 miles distant.Having observed on the tops of these hills a multitude of fragments of stones which appeared to have been broken artificially.Here I unexpectedly found the deserted quarries of the aboriginals... which extend over an area of upwards of one hundred acres, present an appearance somewhat similar to that of a deserted goldfield, and convey a faithful idea of the great determination displayed by the aboriginals.

William Buckley, described a hard black stone he called Kar-keen which was shaped into stone heads.

In the 1880s prominent Wurundjeri leader and custodian of the quarry, William Barak (who probably witnessed the final operations at the quarry) described the traditional ownership and access conventions to ethnographer, Alfred Howitt.

Organised excursions were popular in the early 1900s, as when the District Teachers Association organised an excursion in 1906 and the day was "proclaimed a public holiday in the Shire of Lancefield (sic), so that an opportunity will be afforded to all to be present."

In the 1940s, Fred McCarthy identified a south-east Australia route associated with Mount William among his seven trunk-trade routes.

In the 1960s and 1970s, Mt William drew the attention of anthropologists and archaeologists (notably including Donald Thomson and Isabel McBryde). McBryde's  study of trade systems in the 1970s included investigation of the distribution of axes from Mount William and other quarries in Victoria and New South Wales drawing on ethno-historical sources, linguistic and  archaeological evidence and petrological studies (using thin section analysis for axes from archaeological sites and stone sources), to reveal distribution trends and social value. 
 
McBryde showed Aboriginal exchange networks for Mount William stone extended several hundred kilometres. with distribution determined by the social and political relations between the Kulin and neighbouring groups: sparsely distributed or absent in south-eastern Victoria but more widely distributed in Western Victoria.

Management and conservation

Mount William had long been recognised as a special Aboriginal place when the first attempt was made to provide some formal protection in 1910. The Director of the Museum of Victoria, Baldwin Spencer, sought to establish a committee in association with the Historical Society of Victoria to purchase a portion of the area to form a reserve. However the landowner declined to sell.

In 1917 Allan F. Cameron, Member for Dalhousie in the Victorian Parliament considered that: Something like twenty-five acres of land could be procured at a reasonable price, and fenced in, to be held for all time as the great historic landmark of Australia, furnishing the only indication or proof that we have that this country was inhabited for hundreds of years before the white man came here, In 1918 Cameron sought an appropriation to purchase the land, and again in 1919.  Then in 1921 Cameron reported to Parliament that a gentleman in Melbourne [offered] 300 pounds towards the purchase of that land as a reserve.  He wished it to be handed over to the State or to some organisation. However, Cameron fell seriously ill shortly after and died in December 1923, so that no further action was taken.
 
In 1969, the landowner, a Mr Powell, became concerned about damage to the site, and offered to sell a portion of CA 24 to the Shire of Romsey.  The Shire obtained financial support from the Victorian government in 1971 and the title was transferred in 1972. In 1976, an archaeological area was declared under the Archaeological and Aboriginal Relics Preservation Act 1972 over the council-owned land and the adjoining privately owned CA 16A to the north.

In 1997 the Shire of Romsey (now Macedon Ranges Shire Council) gifted their land to the Indigenous Land Corporation, which subsequently put the site under the management of the Wurundjeri Woi Wurrung Cultural Heritage Aboriginal Corporation, It has also been included on the Register of the National Estate and the Australian National Heritage List.

On October 23, 2012 ownership of the site was officially returned to the Wurundjeri Woi Wurrung Cultural Heritage Aboriginal Corporation.

Geographical location

 Mount William 
 Mount William south west
 Mount William north east

.

See also
 Langdale axe industry
 Wurundjeri

Notes

References

Brough Smyth, R. (1876). "The Aborigines of Victoria: with notes relating to the habits of the natives of other parts of Australia and Tasmania" and compiled from various sources for the Government of Victoria. Melbourne: John Currey, O’Neil 
Coutts, P.J.F. & Miller, R (1977). The Mt. William archaeological area. Melbourne: Victorian Archaeological Survey, Government Printer
Goodison, P (1996). Mount William Axe-Stone Quarry: management resource document. Unpublished document produced for the Heritage Services Branch, Aboriginal Affairs Victoria

 
McBryde, I & Harrison, G (1981). Valued good or valuable stone? Consideration of some aspects of the distribution of greenstone artefacts in southeastern Australia. In B.F. Leach and J. Davidson (eds), Archaeological Studies of Pacific Stone Resources, pp. 183–208. Oxford: British Archaeological Reports.
McBryde, I & Paton, R (n.d.) Submission to the Australian Heritage Council in relation to the assessment of the Mount William Greenstone Axe Quarry nominated for the National Heritage List. Unpublished report. 
McBryde, I. (1978). Wil-im-ee Moor-ring: Or, where do axes come from?: Stone axe distribution and exchange patterns in Victoria. Mankind 11(3):354-382.
McBryde, I (1984a) Exchange in south-east Australia: an ethnographic perspective. Aboriginal History. Vol. 8, no. 2:132-153
McBryde, I (1984b). Kulin greenstone quarries: The social contexts of production and distribution for the Mount William site. World Archaeology 16(2): 267-285. 
McBryde, I (2000). Continuity and discontinuity: Wurundjeri custodianship of Mt William quarry. In S Kleinert and M Neale (eds.) The Oxford companion to Aboriginal Art and Culture (pp. 247–251). Melbourne: Oxford University Press 
McBryde, I & Watchman, A. (1976). The distribution of greenstone axes in southeastern Australia: A preliminary report. Mankind 10(3):163-174.
McBryde, I., Paton, R. & Potezny, V. (1993). Mount William Quarry Surveyed plan June 1993. Unpublished survey plan 

Mulvaney, D.J. & Calaby, J.H. (1985). So much that is new: Baldwin Spencer, 1860-1929: a biography: Melbourne: University of Melbourne Press 
Mulvaney, D.J. & Kamminga, J. (1999). Prehistory of Australia. Crows Nest, Allen & Unwin Pty Ltd
Paton, R (2005). Trading places: changing social values of the Mt William Aboriginal stone quarry. In Macfarlane, I, Mountain, M and Paton, R (eds.) Many Exchanges: archaeology, history, community and the work of Isabel McBryde. Canberra: Aboriginal History Inc (271-286)
West, A.L. (1972). An Aboriginal axe-grinding rock near Mount Macedon, Victoria. Victorian Naturalist vol. 89: 198  200.

Archaeological sites in Victoria (Australia)
Paleoanthropological sites
Australian National Heritage List
Australian Aboriginal cultural history